Onalethata Thekiso (born 14 May 1981) is a Botswana former footballer. He retired in 2016 after playing for Township Rollers and Mochudi Centre Chiefs in the Botswana Premier League. He has won twenty-four caps for the Botswana national football team.

Early life

Club career

International career

Style of play

Career statistics

Honours

Club
 Township Rollers
Botswana Premier League:1
2009-10
FA Cup:1
2010
Mascom Top 8 Cup:1
2011-12
 Mochudi Centre Chiefs
Botswana Premier League:1
2014-15

References

External links
 

Living people
Association football forwards
Botswana footballers
Botswana international footballers
Township Rollers F.C. players
2012 Africa Cup of Nations players
1981 births